If Winter Comes is a 1947 drama film released by MGM. The movie was directed by Victor Saville and based on the 1921 novel by A.S.M. Hutchinson. The film tells the story of an English textbook writer who takes in a pregnant girl. The novel had previously been made into the 1923 film If Winter Comes.

Plot
Set in the English village Penny Green in 1939, the film focuses on Mark Sabre (Walter Pidgeon), an author and publisher who is unhappily married to Mabel (Angela Lansbury), a cold, humorless woman who usually spends her days gossiping with the townspeople. When Mark learns his former sweetheart Nona Tybar (Deborah Kerr) is returning to Penny Green, Mark, unlike his wife, is delighted. Nona is married to Tony Tybar (Hugh French), but  she is still in love with Mark. Mabel is aware of Mark's feelings for Nona, and encourages him to spend time with her, thinking he will decide with whom he wants to spend his life.

As the war starts, Tony is called into the military; Mark attempts to enlist, but a doctor finds a heart condition and prevents him. Nona leaves Penny Green to join the Women's Auxiliary Air Force. Life becomes quiet for Mark until Effie Bright (Janet Leigh), who has been disowned by her father for becoming pregnant, turns to him for help.

Mark helps Effie and lets her live in his home while he looks for a better situation for her. This causes a great scandal, and the townspeople soon denounce Mark. He loses his job as a result of the morals clause at his place of employment. Mabel leaves Mark, believing that he has fathered Effie's baby, and serving Effie with the notice that she is co-respondent in the divorce. Effie, who was already under mental stress because the real father of the baby had not written her, commits suicide by poisoning herself. At the inquest to determine Effie's cause of death, numerous witnesses give anecdotal evidence suggesting a sexual relationship between Mark and Effie. Nona appears, having just learned of Tony's death, and makes a short speech in support of Mark's character. The inquest determines that Effie's cause of death was suicide, and they censure Mark for his behavior.

Returning home, a distraught Mark finds a note addressed to him from Effie. In it, Effie names her lover: Harold Twyning, the son of Mark's former coworker. Mark furiously goes to confront young Twyning's father, but when he gets there, the man is grief-stricken, just having received the news that his son has been killed in the war. Mark decides not to share the letter with him, but just as he is about to burn the letter, he has a heart attack and passes out.

Weeks pass as Mark convalesces. Nona returns to Mark, and they burn Effie's letter together.

Cast
 Walter Pidgeon as Mark Sabre 
 Deborah Kerr as Nona Tybar 
 Angela Lansbury as Mabel Sabre 
 Binnie Barnes as Natalie Bagshaw 
 Janet Leigh as Effie Bright 
 Dame May Whitty as Mrs. Perch 
 Reginald Owen as Mr. Fortune 
 Virginia Keiley as Rebecca 'High Jinks'  
 Rene Ray as Sarah 'Low Jinks'
 Hugh French as Tony Tyber
 Hughie Green as Freddie Perch
 Rhys Williams as Effie's puritanical father
 Owen McGiveney as Uncle Fouraker

Production
Producer David O. Selznick bought the rights of the novel in 1939 and intended on casting either Joan Fontaine or Vivien Leigh in the female lead roles and Leslie Howard or Laurence Olivier in the male leads. Furthermore, John Cromwell was assigned as the film's director. Production was supposed to start on March 1, 1940, but Selznick eventually abandoned the project and sold the rights to Alexander Korda.

In 1943, Robert Donat was set to star, and the production, which was still under direction of Korda, was set to be filmed on location. Donat was supposed to reteam with Greer Garson, with whom he previously starred in Goodbye, Mr. Chips (1939). When Donat suddenly became unavailable, he was replaced by Walter Pidgeon in October 1943. Because the reteaming collapsed, Garson's part went to Deborah Kerr, whose participation was confirmed in April 1947. Direction eventually went to Victor Saville, who had no interest in the project, but agreed to direct it  to work with Kerr.

Impressed by her performance in The Picture of Dorian Gray (1945), Saville assigned Angela Lansbury as Mabel Sabre. The casting of Janet Leigh followed in the summer of 1947. Her accent in the film was coached by the niece of C. Aubrey Smith.

Saville, determined on making films visually realistic, introduced "indirect lighting" in the film.

Reception
The film earned $1,115,000 in the U.S. and Canada and $834,000 in other markets, resulting in a loss of $465,000.

References

External links
 
 
 
 

1947 films
1940s war drama films
Metro-Goldwyn-Mayer films
American romantic drama films
American black-and-white films
Films based on British novels
Films directed by Victor Saville
Films scored by Herbert Stothart
Films set in England
Films about writers
Films set in 1939
1947 romantic drama films
American war drama films
1940s American films